Iodo may refer to;
Socotra Rock, in the East China Sea
Iodo (film), 1977 South Korean film directed by Kim Ki-young
Iodine, chemical element